Robert Watkin Wynne (c. 1754 – 2 March 1806), of Garthmeilo, Merionethshire and Plas Newydd, Denbighshire, was a Welsh politician.

He was the only surviving son of Robert Wynne of Garthmeilio and Plas Newydd and educated at Westminster School (1767–71) and  Jesus College, Oxford (1773). He succeeded his  father in 1782 and was appointed High Sheriff of Merionethshire for 1798–1799.

He was a Member (MP) of the Parliament of Great Britain for Denbighshire from 28 August 1789 to 1796.

He married Anne Sobieski, the daughter of Thomas Dod of Edge, Cheshire; they had one son.

References

 

1754 births
1806 deaths
People from Merionethshire
Members of the Parliament of Great Britain for Denbighshire
People educated at Westminster School, London
Alumni of Jesus College, Oxford
Members of the Parliament of Great Britain for Welsh constituencies
High Sheriffs of Merionethshire
British MPs 1784–1790
British MPs 1790–1796